Sendokai Champions (known as Desafío Champions Sendokai in Spain) is a Spanish animated television series developed by Kotoc Produccions for Televisión Española. The series is created by Kotoc.

A second 26x12 season was released in May 2014 on Cartoon Network.

The series was originally planned to air in the United States on The CW's Vortexx block during the 2013–14 season. However, it never ended up scheduled before the block's end in September 2014. Instead, Sendokai Champions ended up premiering on YouTube. However, the episodes have now been made unlisted.

Plot

Zak, Cloe, Kiet and Fenzy are four unpopular kids from Earth who are not very good at sports. One day they find bracelets that have the power to transport them to another dimension. There they meet Tänpo, the master, who explains that the Zorn Empire is about to conquer the Multiverse. The Earth is in danger and, if they want to save it, there is only one way: they will have to overcome their weaknesses, learn the art of Sendokai to become warriors, and win the Great Sendokai Tournament of the Multiverse.

Characters
Zak - Zak likes to be the center of attention.
Cloe - Cloe is an intelligent and responsible girl.
Kiet - Kiet is the laziest guy in the multiverse.
Fenzy - Fenzy is quite a character: brave, proud, and sarcastic.
Tänpo - Tänpo is the Sendokai master of the kids 
Lula - Lula is Tänpo's pet and his only companion 
Sidmodius - Minister Sidmodius would do anything for the Zorn... or so he says.
Lalith - Lalith is a commander of the Zorn empire but then she redeems.
Kazkrad - Kazkrad is the other Zorn commander.
Kento/Marshal Zorn  - The Marshal is the leader of the Zorn and directs the empire with an iron fist, conquering all dimensions in its path but then he redeems himself.
Lon - Lon joins the group in season 2, and quickly becomes Cloe's love interest, to Zak's disgust. He has a dark and goth appearance then in the final he becomes on the great zorn.
Kido - Same as Lon, he joins the Sendokai group in season 2. He's a Kiwun from planet Masara and when not fighting, he usually serves as comic relief.

Series overview

List of episodes

Season 1 (2013)

Season 2 (2014)

External links
 The official Sendokai Champions YouTube channel (unlisted)

References

2010s animated television series
Spanish children's animated action television series
Spanish children's animated adventure television series
Spanish children's animated comedy television series
Animated television series about children
Association football television series
Child superheroes
Computer-animated television series
RTVE shows
Television series about parallel universes